Torrent Club de Fútbol is a Spanish football team based in Torrent, in the Valencian Community. Founded in 1922, it plays in Tercera División RFEF – Group 6, holding home matches at Estadio San Gregorio.

History
Founded in 1922, Torrent CF first reached Tercera División in 1965. After five seasons the club suffered relegation, and remained in the regional leagues until 1982.

In 1990, it first reached Segunda División B, but returned to the fourth division after two campaigns. In 1993, after suffering another relegation, the club folded.

A new club, named Torrent UE, was founded immediately after Torrent CF's dissolution and played for four full seasons before dissolving. In the 90s, Torrent EF was founded and became Torrent CF's historical heir. In 2006, the club regained the old name Torrent CF.

Season to season

Torrente CF/Torrent CF (1922–1993)

Torrent UE (1993–1997)

Torrent CF (1998)

2 seasons in Segunda División B
14 seasons in Tercera División
1 season in Tercera División RFEF

External links
 
ArefePedia team profile 

Football clubs in the Valencian Community
Association football clubs established in 1922
1922 establishments in Spain
Province of Valencia